Bemis Hall may refer to:

Bemis Hall (Colorado Springs, Colorado)
Bemis Hall (Lincoln, Massachusetts)

Architectural disambiguation pages